The West Region of Singapore is one of the five regions in the city-state. The region is the largest in terms of land area and is the third most populous region after the North-East Region and Central Region. Jurong East is the regional centre of the region, with plans of developing the Jurong Lake District into a second CBD area. Jurong West is the most populous town in the region, with a population of 262,730 residents. Comprising 25,500 hectares of land area, it includes twelve planning areas and is home to about 922,540 residents.

Geography
The region is largely made up of residential towns and established industrial estates. Located at the southernmost part of the region, far away from the main residential and commercial areas, Jurong Island and Tuas house a majority of Singapore's heavy industries.

Government
The region is locally governed by two different Community Development Councils, namely the North West CDC and South West CDC, and is divided into 12 planning areas.

Planning Areas

Other major areas
Lakeside, Singapore
Buona Vista
Ghim Moh
Holland Village
Pandan Gardens
Jurong Island
Kent Ridge
Nanyang
Pioneer
Pasir Laba
Teban Gardens
Toh Tuck
Tuas South
West Coast
Dover
Gul Circle

Economy
The West Region is home to a majority of Singapore's heavy industries, mainly the petrochemical industry, with international oil and gas and chemicals companies, such as  LANXESS, Afton Chemical, BASF, BP, Celanese, Evonik, ExxonMobil, DuPont, Mitsui Chemicals, Chevron Oronite, Shell, Singapore Petroleum Company and Sumitomo Chemical operating facilities on Jurong Island and Pulau Bukom. The area makes up about 5% of Singapore's GDP and top three export refining centres in the world, with the world's seventh largest oil refinery.

A second Central Business District is also planned to be developed in the Jurong Lake District, with the Kuala Lumpur–Singapore High Speed Rail terminus supposed to be located there, before the project was cancelled.

Education
Residents of the area have access to different educational facilities ranging from preschools to primary and secondary schools, as these are located around the different towns in the West region. The area is also home to various tertiary institutions, such as  APSN Delta Senior School, ITE College West, Jurong Junior College, Millennia Institute, Nanyang Technological University, National University of Singapore, Ngee Ann Polytechnic, NUS High School of Math and Science, Pioneer Junior College, River Valley High School, Singapore University of Social Sciences, School of Science and Technology, Singapore Polytechnic, Singapore Hotel and Tourism Education Centre, Canadian International School (an international school), and Grace Orchard School (a special needs school).

References

External links 
 West Region, Singapore

 
Planning areas in Singapore
Regions of Singapore